"Through the Night" is a single release by British electronic production group Drumsound & Bassline Smith featuring vocals from Tom Cane. It was included in their 2013 album Wall of Sound. The song was released on 29 July 2012. The song peaked at number 34 on the UK Singles Chart.

Music video
A music video to accompany the release of "Through the Night" was first released onto YouTube on 9 July 2012 at a total length of three minutes and four seconds. As of March 2016 it has received more than 1.6 million views.

Track listing

Chart performance

Release history

References

2012 singles
Drumsound & Bassline Smith songs
2012 songs